Government of Sudan is the federal provisional government created by the constitution of Sudan having the executive, parliament, and the judiciary. Previously, a president was head of state, head of government, and commander-in-chief of the Sudanese Armed Forces in a de jure multi-party system. Legislative power was officially vested in both the government and in the two chambers, the National Assembly (lower) and the Council of States (higher), of the bicameral National Legislature. The judiciary is independent and obtained by the Constitutional Court. However, following a deadly civil war and the still ongoing genocide in Darfur, Sudan was widely recognized as a totalitarian state where all effective political power was held by President Omar al-Bashir and his National Congress Party (NCP). However, al-Bashir and the NCP were ousted in a military coup which occurred on April 11, 2019. The government of Sudan was then led by the Transitional Military Council or TMC. On 20 August 2019, the TMC dissolved giving its authority over to the Sovereignty Council of Sudan, who were planned to govern for 39 months until 2022, in the process of transitioning to democracy. However, the Sovereignty Council and the Sudanese government were dissolved in October 2021.

Executive 
 and then

|-
|Head of Sudan
|Abdel Fattah al-Burhan
|(military)
|25 October 2021
|-
|Prime Minister
|Osman Hussein

|}

President al-Bashir's government was dominated by members of Sudan's National Islamic Front (NIF), a fundamentalist political organization formed from the Muslim Brotherhood in 1986; in 1998, the NIF founded the National Congress as its legal front; the National Congress/NIF dominates much of Khartoum's overall domestic and foreign policies; President al-Bashir named a new cabinet on April 20, 1996 which includes members of the National Islamic Front, serving and retired military officers, and civilian technocrats; on March 8, 1998, he reshuffled the cabinet and brought in several former rebel and opposition members as ministers; he reshuffled his cabinet again on January 24, 2000 but announced few changes. A government of national unity was sworn in on 22 September, with 16 members from the National Congress, nine from the SPLM and two from the northern opposition National Democratic Alliance, which left the seats vacant in protest over how the posts were allocated. The Darfur rebels were not represented. Al-Bashir, as chairman of the Revolutionary Command Council for National Salvation (RCC), assumed power on June 30, 1989 and served concurrently as chief of state, chairman of the RCC, prime minister, and minister of defense until 16 October 1993 when he was appointed president by the RCC; upon its dissolution on 16 October 1993, the RCC's executive and legislative powers were devolved to the president and the Transitional National Assembly (TNA), Sudan's appointed legislative body, which has since been replaced by the National Assembly elected in March 1996; on December 12, 1999 Bashir dismissed the National Assembly during an internal power struggle between the president and speaker of the Parliament Hasan al-Turabi

On April 11, 2019, al-Bashir was ousted in a coup led by Vice President and Defense Minister Ahmed Awad Ibn Auf, with his government then being dissolved afterwards. On April 12, 2019, Auf, who still served as Minister of Defense, handed power to Lt. General Abdel Fattah Abdelrahman Burhan, general inspector of the armed forces. Auf would also give up his position as Minister of Defense on April 14, 2019. On October 25, 2021, Burhan dissolved the Sudanese government and the Sovereignty Council which ruled Sudan in the aftermath of al-Bashir's downfall following another successful coup.

Legislative 
The country was recently in an interim (transitional) period following the signing of a Comprehensive Peace Agreement (CPA) on 9 January 2005 that officially ended the civil war between the Sudanese Government (based in Khartoum) and the southern-based Sudan People's Liberation Movement (SPLM) rebel group. The newly formed National Legislature, whose members were chosen in mid-2005, had two chambers. The National Assembly (Majlis Watani) consisted of 450 appointed members who represent the government, former rebels, and other opposition political parties. The Council of States (Majlis Welayat) had 50 members who are indirectly elected by state legislatures. All members of the National Legislature served six-year terms. However, the National Legislature was dissolved during the April 2019 coup as well.

Judicial 
Supreme Court; Special Revolutionary Court.

Legal system 
The legal system is based on Islamic law; as of January 20, 1991, the now defunct Revolutionary Command Council imposed Islamic law in the northern states; Islamic law applies to all residents of the northern states regardless of their religion; some separate religious courts; accepts compulsory International Court of Justice jurisdiction, with reservations.

Administrative divisions 
Sudan is divided into twenty-six states, each of which were governed by a governor and council of ministers, each member of each state of council of ministers were appointed by the president of the country. The elections of governors was different from others, the president picks three people who he decided will be running against each other, the one who wins at least 50% popular vote is the governor of that state. If no one wins at least 50% popular vote, the person with the fewest votes is disqualified from the campaign and they redo the election and then someone has to have at least 50% popular vote. The following are the states of Sudan. (wilayat, singular wilayah): A'ali an Nil, Al Bahr al Ahmar, Al Buhayrat, Al Jazirah, Al Khartum, Al Qadarif, Al Wahdah, An Nil al Abyad, An Nil al Azraq, Ash Shamaliyah, Bahr al Jabal, Gharb al Istiwa'iyah, Gharb Bahr al Ghazal, Gharb Darfur, Gharb Kurdufan, Janub Darfur, Janub Kurdufan, Junqali, Kassala, Nahr an Nil, Shamal Bahr al Ghazal, Shamal Darfur, Shamal Kurdufan, Sharq al Istiwa'iyah, Sinnar, Warab. However, state governments and their legislative councils were also dissolved during the April 2019 coup as well.

State and local government 
Relations between the central government and local authorities have been a persistent problem in Sudan. According to the Interim National Constitution, each state had its own legislative, executive, and judicial organs. The state-empowered local government and state constitutions determined the organization and electoral procedures for local government. Each state was headed by a governor and a state council of ministers. The governor, together with the state council of ministers, exercised the executive powers of the state in compliance with the schedule of responsibilities set forth in the Interim National Constitution. Each state had its own capital and was divided into several localities or provinces, which, in turn, were subdivided into administrative units. Governors were elected in 2010, and they appointed their own ministers. All 15 Northern governors were from the NCP except for the Blue Nile governor, who was a member of the SPLM. Revenue flowed upward to the federal treasury. Some levels of government became so small, however, that they did not have a solid financial base.

International organization participation 

African, Caribbean and Pacific Group of States
African Development Bank
African Union
Arab Bank for Economic Development in Africa
Arab Fund for Economic and Social Development
Arab League, formally the League of Arab States
Arab Monetary Fund
Common Market for Eastern and Southern Africa
Council of Arab Economic Unity
Food and Agriculture Organization
Group of 77 (G77)
Intergovernmental Authority on Development
International Atomic Energy Agency
International Bank for Reconstruction and Development
International Civil Aviation Organization
International Criminal Court
International Criminal Police Organization - Interpol
International Development Association
International Federation of Red Cross and Red Crescent Societies
International Finance Corporation
International Fund for Agricultural Development
International Labour Organization
International Maritime Organization
International Monetary Fund (IMF)
International Olympic Committee (IOC)
International Organization for Migration
International Organization for Standardization (ISO)
International Red Cross and Red Crescent Movement
International Telecommunications Satellite Organization
International Telecommunication Union
Inter-Parliamentary Union
Islamic Development Bank
Multilateral Investment Guarantee Agency
Non-Aligned Movement
Organisation of African Unity
Organisation of Islamic Cooperation
Organisation for the Prohibition of Chemical Weapons
Permanent Court of Arbitration
UNESCO
UNICEF
United Nations
United Nations Conference on Trade and Development
United Nations Economic Commission for Africa (UNECA)
United Nations High Commissioner for Refugees (UNHCR)
United Nations Industrial Development Organization (UNIDO)
United Nations University
Universal Postal Union (UPU)
World Customs Organization
World Health Organization
World Intellectual Property Organization
World Meteorological Organization
World Tourism Organization (UNWTO)
World Trade Organization (observer)

See also 

 Politics of Sudan

References 
Government of Sudan

External links